Santa Claus Lane is the debut studio album and first Christmas album by American singer Hilary Duff. It was released in the United States on October 15, 2002 by Buena Vista Records. The holiday album contains covers of Christmas songs, including "Santa Claus Is Coming to Town", "Jingle Bell Rock" "Wonderful Christmastime", "Sleigh Ride", and "Last Christmas". The album also features guest appearances from Christina Milian, Romeo Miller and Hilary's older sister Haylie Duff.

Santa Claus Lane peaked at number two on US Billboard Top Heatseekers and Top Kid Audio charts and peaked at number 154 on the US Billboard 200. It has been certified Gold by the Recording Industry Association of America (RIAA) for shipping 500,000 copies to retailers. In Japan in peaked at number 134 on the Oricon albums chart in 2004. The title song was featured in the 2002 Christmas comedy film The Santa Clause 2.

Background and recording 
In 2001, Duff gained fame through her starring role in the Disney Channel series Lizzie McGuire. She became interested in pursuing a music career after attending a Radio Disney concert in 2001. "There were all these pop acts backstage at the concert," Duff explained. "They were all getting ready backstage and warming up, and I was like, 'I want to do this so bad.'" One day, Duff met Andre Recke, who would soon become her manager. She told him of her interest in becoming a singer and briefly performed for him. This prompted him to tell her, "I want to work with you." Recke said of his encounter with Duff, "When I met Hilary, I knew she had something special. Sometimes you just have that feeling, that, 'Wow, she's a star.'"

Duff's music career began with two soundtrack appearances. In 2002, she appeared on the soundtrack to Lizzie McGuire, performing a cover of Brooke McClymont's "I Can't Wait", and the Walt Disney Records compilation DisneyMania, performing a cover of "The Tiki Tiki Tiki Room". Recke noted of Duff's DisneyMania appearance, "That was the first test to see how her fans would react to her as a singer and not just an actress". Duff stated that she felt Christmas came early for her when she recorded Santa Claus Lane. She continued, "I really loved singing these songs. It was a lot of hard work, but also big fun!"

"I Heard Santa on the Radio" and "Tell Me a Story" are duets with Christina Milian and Lil' Romeo, respectively, and "Same Old Christmas" features Duff's sister Haylie. Santa Claus Lane features production from Matthew Gerrard, Chris Hamm, Alain Bertoni, Charlie Midnight and Chico Bennett; on the 2003 reissue, the bonus track "What Christmas Should Be" is produced by Charlton Pettus. This song was featured on the end credits and soundtrack of her family comedy film Cheaper by the Dozen (2003).

In a 2013 interview with the website Idolator, Duff expressed her dislike for "Tell Me a Story", saying that she "honestly hate[s] that record — [and she has] blocked it out of [her] memory". Duff also remarked that she "[didn't] even remember" the song.

Release and promotion 
Santa Claus Lane was released in the United States on October 15, 2002 by Walt Disney Records. It was reissued on October 14 of the following year with the bonus track "What Christmas Should Be", and released by Buena Vista Records.

Two singles were released from the album simultaneously on December 2, 2002. "Santa Claus Lane" was sent to pop radio stations, while "Tell Me a Story" was sent to rhythmic and urban radio stations. A music video for "Santa Claus Lane", featuring Duff performing on Disney's Movie Surfers to promote the film The Santa Clause 2, received airplay on Disney Channel. Duff filmed a music video for "Tell Me a Story" with Lil' Romeo which also received heavy rotation on Disney Channel.

Critical reception 

Santa Claus Lane received mixed reviews from music critics. An AllMusic editor gave the album three out of five stars. Jaan Uhelszki, in an editorial review for Amazon.com, gave Santa Claus Lane a negative review. She wrote the album, consisting mostly of Christmas covers, "add[s] little to the holiday music canon". She also felt that it only "perks up" on songs that feature guest musicians. Kelefa Sanneh of The New York Times joked it was a "concept album" which was "loosely inspired by Saint Nicholas, the fourth-century bishop of Myra." Christopher Thelen gave a more positive review to the album. While writing for the Daily Vault, Thelen gave a B− grade and wrote it "does show there is a voice behind the pretty young face, even if this is a strange place to start one's recording career."

Commercial performance
Santa Claus Lane debuted at number 154 on the Billboard 200, and also reached the second position of both the Top Heatseekers and Top Kid Albums charts. On December 9, 2003, the album was certified Gold by the Recording Industry Association of America for 500,000 shipments to retailers. The album reached the 134th position of the Japanese Albums Chart in 2004. As of July 27, 2014, the album had sold 477,000 copies in the United States.

Track listing 

Notes
 signifies a co-producer

Personnel 
Credits for Santa Claus Lane adapted from AllMusic.

 Deborah Araya – Stylist
 Chico Bennett – Producer
 Alain Bertoni – Producer
 Savina Ciaramella – A&R
 J. Fred Coots – Composer
 Matthew Gerrard – Producer
 Haven Gillespie – Composer
 Chris Hamm – Producer

 Martin Häusler – Design
 Jay Landers – Executive producer
 Gavin Lurssen – Mastering
 Dani Markman – Artist coordination
 Charlie Midnight – Producer
 Andre Recke – Executive producer
 Denny Weston, Jr. – Producer

Charts

Weekly charts

Certifications

Release history

References 

2002 Christmas albums
2002 debut albums
Albums produced by Chico Bennett
Albums produced by Matthew Gerrard
Buena Vista Records albums
Christmas albums by American artists
Pop Christmas albums
Hilary Duff albums
Walt Disney Records albums
Walt Disney Records Christmas albums